UT Medical School may refer to:
 Dell Medical School (University of Texas System)
 McGovern Medical School a.k.a. University of Texas Medical School at Houston
 University of Tennessee Health Science Center